Kangshiyadi  is a village and former Rajput non-salute princely state in Gujarat, western India.

History 
Kangshiyadi was a petty princely state comprising only the village, in the Halar prant of Kathiawar, ruled by Jadeja Rajput Chieftains.

It had a population of 224 in 1901, yielding a state revenue of 2,538 Rupees (1903-1904, mostly from land) and a paying a tribute of 111 Rupees, to the British and Junagadh State.

Sources and external links
 Imperial Gazetteer of India, v. 15, p. 167

Princely states of Gujarat
Rajput princely states